The 1940 Palestine League was the eighth season of league football in the British Mandate for Palestine. The defending champions were Hapoel Tel Aviv.

Eight clubs took part in the league. The league was played between 27 January and 29 June 1940. All clubs completed their schedule of 14 matches.

The championship was won by defending champions Hapoel Tel Aviv.

League table

References
RSSSF
Previous seasons The Israel Football Association 

Palestine League seasons
Palestine
1
Palestine
1